Scarlet Angel is a 1952 American Technicolor historical adventure film directed by Sidney Salkow and starring Yvonne de Carlo, Rock Hudson and Richard Denning. It was produced and distributed by Universal Pictures. The two leads appeared together again in Sea Devils the following year.

Plot

New Orleans, 1865: In a disreputable saloon, the Scarlet Angel, sea captain Frank Truscott observes as scheming, gold-digging saloon girl Roxy McClanahan steals one customer's wallet and then sets her sights on him.

Discovering a sick woman with a baby, Roxy volunteers to spend the night. She comes up with an idea after the mother dies, stealing her identity and heading to San Francisco to find the woman's wealthy relatives, hoping to bring the baby back and receive an award. The dead woman's cousins are there, Susan Bradley not trusting Roxy while brother Malcolm Bradley develops both a romantic and economic interest in her.

Roxy plays a pair of suitors against each other until Frank suddenly returns to complicate her ambitions and to demand the money she stole. She becomes pressured to reveal her true identity and the child's. By the time she does, Roxy and Frank find themselves back in another saloon, bickering and fighting.

Cast
 Yvonne de Carlo as Roxy McClannahan
 Rock Hudson as Frank Truscott
 Richard Denning as Malcolm Bradley
 Whitfield Connor as Norton Wade
 Bodil Miller as Linda Caldwell 
 Amanda Blake as Susan Bradley
 Henry O'Neill as Morgan Caldwell
 Henry Brandon as Pierre 
 Maude Wallace as Eugenia Caldwell 
 Dan Riss as Walter Frisby
 Tol Avery as Phineas Calhoun
 	Marlo Dwyer as	Daisy
 Creighton Hale as Judge Ames

Production
The film was based on an original screenplay by Oscar Brodney, however a New York Times review said it bore a strong resemblance to The Flame of New Orleans (1941).

Yvonne de Carlo agreed to make it under a new contract she had signed with Universal to make one film a year. Rock Hudson was cast opposite her and received his first star billing for the role.

Filming began in November 1951.

Reception
The New York Times said "as a fetching Technicolor showcase for a lady who decidedly rates framing" the film "has its points. For some time Yvonne De Carlo has been flouncing through a series of routine costume adventures as a tough but good-natured minx from across the tracks who wades into society and inevitably backtracks with a bloke of her own caliber. This new one... is the mixture as before, nicely tinted, harmless and predictable from the word De Carlo.... The ornamental Miss De Carlo, who also has the makings of a fine, brassy comedienne, is still marking time on a stereotyped leash."

References

External links

1952 films
Films directed by Sidney Salkow
1950s historical adventure films
1950s English-language films
American historical adventure films
Films set in the 19th century
Universal Pictures films
1950s American films
Films set in New Orleans
Films set in San Francisco